The Interactive Fiction Technology Foundation (IFTF) is a nonprofit charitable organization founded in June 2016 working to maintain, improve, and preserve tools and services used in the creation and distribution of interactive fiction.

Activities 
Since 2016, IFTF operates the Interactive Fiction Competition (IFComp), an annual competition for new works from independent creators which has been running since 1995.

Since 2017, IFTF operates the Interactive Fiction Archive (IF Archive), an archive preserving the history of interactive fiction which has been operating since 1992. The IF Archive contains websites and documents valuable to the IF community, including the "Inform 6" website and standards such as "the Treaty of Babel",, the Z-machine, and its successor Glulx.

Since 2019, IFTF supports the Interactive Fiction Community Forum (IntFiction) at intfiction.org, which has served as a center for interactive fiction community discussion since 2006.

Since 2021, IFTF operates the Interactive Fiction Database (IFDB), a database of metadata and reviews of interactive fiction which was founded by Michael J. Roberts in 2007.

Since 2022 IFTF supports the Interactive Fiction Wiki (IFWiki), a community-maintained resource for the history and culture of interactive fiction which was originally set up by David Cornelson in 2004.

IFTF supports and hosts the Twine software, initially created by Chris Klimas in 2009.

Organization 
Among the members of the Board of Directors are Jason McIntosh (president), Judith Pintar and Andrew Plotkin.

Among the members of the Advisory Board are Jon Ingold, Max Gladstone, Nick Montfort, Brian Moriarty, Jim Munroe, Graham Nelson and Emily Short.

References

External links 
 

Arts charities
Information technology charities